Alpha Omega is the ninth and final studio album by Finnish rapper Cheek, released on 16 October 2015. The album peaked at number one on the Finnish Albums Chart.

Singles

The release was preceded by single "Sä huudat" which peaked at number one on the Finnish Singles Chart.

Track listing

Charts

Release history

See also
List of number-one albums of 2015 (Finland)

References

2015 albums
Cheek (rapper) albums
Finnish-language albums